Laurence Gluck (born 1953) is an American New York-based real estate investor, landlord, and the founder of the real estate company Stellar Management.

Early life and education
Gluck was born to a Jewish family, raised in a two bedroom, one bathroom rent-controlled apartment in the Bronx. He has two brothers and a sister. His father worked for a catering company and operated a restaurant and his mother worked as a bookkeeper at a Chrysler dealership. Gluck worked as a waiter in the Catskills. In 1968, the family moved to Rego Park, Queens. He graduated from Queens College with a B.A. in Psychology and then a J.D. from St. John's University School of Law.

After school, he worked at several law firms before working as a litigator at the law firm of Proskauer, Rose, Goetz & Mendellsohn and then in 1980, he accepted a job in real estate law at Dreyer & Traub where he later became a partner. He took a pay reduction (from $50,000 to $35,000) to go to Dreyer and Traub. Raising money from family and friends, he purchased his first building in Carroll Gardens, Brooklyn.

Career
In 1985, he partnered with fellow Dreyer & Traub attorney Steve Witkoff and founded Stellar Management (the name Stellar is derived from Steve and Larry), and purchased cheap buildings in Washington Heights. In 1998, due to the collapse of the real estate market, Witkoff and Gluck dissolved their partnership with Gluck taking the residential properties under his firm Stellar Management and Witkoff the office buildings under his firm the Witkoff Group. Stellar, with Gluck at the helm, then focused on the repositioning and renovation of subsidized middle-class housing rental housing in New York City.

Since 2004, he has purchased over a dozen aging residential complexes that had been built with state subsidies (see Mitchell-Lama program). As the subsidies expired, he replaced rent-regulated residents with market rate tenants (typically paying twice or thrice the rent). Although he typically renovates the facilities, he has had confrontations with tenant groups at several of his properties including Independence Plaza in Manhattan, Meadow Manor in Flushing, Queens, and Castleton Park on Staten Island and has been criticized for reducing the rent-regulated inventory of housing stock in New York City. In 2005, he borrowed $250 million to buy and renovate the Riverton Houses, a 1,232-unit residential development in Harlem, New York City, with 90 percent of its units rent-stabilized, but lost it to foreclosure in 2008 as the real estate boom collapsed.

In 2005, Gluck signed a contract to buy the 33-story Tivoli Towers in Crown Heights, Brooklyn, with plans to take it out of the Mitchell-Lama program but was forestalled when tenants discovered a covenant that prohibited Tivoli from leaving the Mitchell-Lama program until 2024. Litigation ensued and the confrontation became politicized with both borough president Marty Markowitz and U.S. Senator Chuck Schumer opposing Gluck's purchase. In 2010, New York City's Housing Development Corporation, unable to find another buyer who would renovate the aging property, struck a deal with Gluck: the city would provide Gluck with a $45.7 million low-interest mortgage to purchase the facility and Gluck would be allowed to raise rents although in a more measured way (still doubling them). The expiration of the Mitchell-Lama credits would also be extended from 2024 to 2040. As of 2010, Stellar management owns 24,000 apartments in New York, Chicago, Washington and San Francisco.

Personal life
He is married to Dr. Sandra Gluck; they have three daughters: Amanda, Dana, and Heather.

References

External links
CunyTV: BuildingNY: "Laurence Gluck, Chairman & CEO, Stellar Management"

American real estate businesspeople
20th-century American Jews
1953 births
Businesspeople from Queens, New York
People from the Bronx
Living people
People from Rego Park, Queens
American landlords
21st-century American Jews